Carolyne Roehm (born Jane Smith; May 7, 1951) is an American author, businesswoman, socialite, and former fashion designer.

Early life
Roehm was born Jane Smith in Kirksville, Missouri to a middle-class high school principal and a schoolteacher. She graduated from Washington University in St. Louis with a Bachelor of Fine Arts degree in 1973. Following her graduation, she moved to New York City.

Career
Following her graduation from Washington University, Roehm moved to New York City to work at Kellwood Company, a women's clothing manufacturer.

Roehm started her high fashion career working for Oscar de la Renta as an assistant and model before becoming an assistant designer. De la Renta became a mentor and father figure to her, even threatening her then-significant other, Henry Kravis, when he did not immediately propose to Roehm upon his divorce to his first wife.

In 1985, after ten years working for Oscar de la Renta, Roehm launched her own fashion house. Roehm's high-end clothing was designed for women with money, active lifestyles and calendars filled with social engagements and work outside the house. Although it received accolades, she shut down the line in 1991. While she formally discontinued her clothing line, she still employed a small staff to run a mail-order business and produce an exclusive line for Saks.

During her time in the fashion industry, she was elected President of the Council of Fashion Designers of America and guided the organization as it became a major supporter of AIDS research.

Moving beyond clothing, Roehm broadened her design horizons and shifted her focus to the world of flowers, entertaining, gardens, interiors and products. Throughout her design career, she has created clothing, accessories, books, decorative accessories for the home, interiors, home fragrance and candles, table linens and table tops, paper products, glassware, and luggage.

Her late friend, Bill Blass, said of her, "[s]he is the ultimate tastemaker."

Roehm has published at least ten books on topics such as gardening, interior decorating, gift wrapping, flower arranging, and party planning.

Personal life
Roehm's first marriage was to German chemical heir, Axel Roehm. Their marriage lasted about a year. She later married Henry Kravis in 1985, but the marriage ended in divorce in 1993. The home, decorated for the couple by Robert Denning and Vincent Fourcade, was parodied in the 1990 movie The Bonfire of the Vanities.

In the 1980s, Roehm and Kravis were symbols of the "Nouvelle Societé" in Manhattan. The two were known for hosting lavish parties, including one that was held in the Metropolitan Museum of Art. They owned four properties worth millions each (such as their $5.5 million Park Avenue apartment), antiques from King Louis XV, and artwork from artists such as Renoir and Sargent.

Roehm resides in New York, Connecticut, Colorado, and South Carolina.

See also
Kohlberg Kravis Roberts

References

Living people
1951 births
American socialites
American women writers
American fashion designers
American women fashion designers
Washington University in St. Louis alumni